Corbiere (1975–1988) was a racehorse who won the Grand National in 1983. In training Corbiere was also known as Corky.

Background
Corbiere was a chestnut gelding with a broad white blaze bred in the United Kingdom by M Parkhill. During his racing career he was trained by Jenny Pitman at Lambourn.

Racing career
In December 1982 the seven-year-old Corbiere won the Welsh Grand National and was then aimed at the 1983 Grand National. At Aintree he carried 158 pounds and started at odds on 13/1 and was ridden by Ben De Haan. Corbiere was always among the leaders and went to the front after Valentine's Brook on the second circuit. He was strongly challenged by the Irish horse Greasepaint in the run-in but held on to win by three-quarters of a length. His victory made Pitman the first woman to train a Grand National winner.

Corbiere also came third in the 1984 and 1985 Grand Nationals, and after falling in 1986, he finished 12th in 1987.

Grand National record

Pedigree

References

1975 racehorse births
1988 racehorse deaths
Racehorses bred in the United Kingdom
Racehorses trained in the United Kingdom
Grand National winners
National Hunt racehorses
Thoroughbred family 3-j
Welsh Grand National winners